Charley Crockett (born March 24, 1984) is an American blues, country, and Americana singer, guitarist, and songwriter. He has released ten albums since 2015, with Lil G.L.'s Blue Bonanza peaking at number 11 on the US Billboard Blues Albums chart. In 2020, Crockett released a mixtape containing low-fidelity recordings titled Field Recordings, Vol. 1 and the studio album Welcome to Hard Times. In 2021, Crockett released two albums, 10 for Slim: Charley Crockett Sings James Hand (a tribute album to James "Slim" Hand) and Music  City USA. His tenth studio album, Lil G.L. Presents: Jukebox Charley, was released April 22, 2022. Crockett released his second album of 2022, The Man From Waco, on September 9.

Early life
A distant relative of Davy Crockett, Charley was born in San Benito, Texas, United States.  Raised by a single mother with an older brother and sister, Crockett grew up in a trailer park in Los Fresnos, Texas. His mother relocated the family to Dallas, and Crockett spent the summer months with his uncle, who lived in the French Quarter of New Orleans. Upon leaving high school at the age of 17, Crockett decided to travel with his guitar acquired by his mother from a pawn shop.  Crockett noted "I taught myself how to play and started to write songs immediately, without any chord knowledge or anything. I didn't know what key I was in for 12 years, but my ear was really good, and I could play in any key and any chord. I just didn't know what it was." His early musical influences came from hearing hip hop, and he became fascinated with the samples used.  Crockett said, "I got into Curtis Mayfield through samples of his songs by other artists, and Nina Simone was through a sample. Even J. Cole, I was listening to a song of his ("Kenny Lofton"), and it was based on the sample from the Manhattans version of 'Hurt.

Crockett played music on the streets in the French Quarter of New Orleans and in Deep Ellum, Dallas as a teenager. Later he traveled further afield by hitchhiking and riding freight, and by 2009 he was busking in New York City. As he improved his performance skills, Crockett organized a street band called the Trainrobbers, which caught the attention of a Manhattan-based representative for Sony Music.  She signed the 26-year-old Crockett to a two-year management contract, although he rejected a publishing deal. Eventually tired of life on the streets and the pending expiration of the contract, Crockett relocated to Northern California, where he combined working on farms and communes with performing for three more years. Crockett then existed on the streets in Paris, France, for a year, and briefly lived in Spain and Morocco.

During these years, Crockett struggled to stay on the right side of the law. In the U.S., he sold marijuana to get by, at one point working the harvest in a clandestine marijuana field in the Pacific Northwest, and was arrested for possession in 2014. He was convicted of a felony twice. Music provided the way out. Crockett noted later, "People think my story is far-fetched, but the thing is, I've toned it down."

Career 
In 2015, Crockett returned to Texas and after settling in Dallas, self-released his debut album, A Stolen Jewel, in May. It landed him the Dallas Observer Music Award for 'Best Blues Act'. The lo-fi collection contained a cover of the Flying Burrito Brothers' "Juanita." Crockett also befriended Leon Bridges at this time, before Crockett released a blues-dominated album, In The Night, in 2016. In The Night contained a selection of Crockett-penned numbers, along with a cover of his hometown hero Freddy Fender's "Wasted Days and Wasted Nights". Fort Worth Star-Telegram called In The Night "an impressive calling card, full of Crockett's plaintive soulfulness and swinging tempos". Crockett spent the next year touring to promote his work, playing over 125 shows in total. He toured with the Turnpike Troubadours, Lucero, Shinyribs, Samantha Fish, and Old 97's, among others.

After relocating to Austin, Texas, Crockett's next release was a collection of covers of country songs, Lil G.L.'s Honky Tonk Jubilee (2017), which was issued on Thirty Tigers. Tracks included the Roy Acuff-penned "Night Train to Memphis", Tanya Tucker’s "The Jamestown Ferry" and Hank Williams' "Honky Tonkin'", all incorporating Crockett's clipped, hiccuped Texan drawl. Other tracks on the album were originally recorded by Ernest Tubb, Loretta Lynn, and Webb Pierce ("I Ain't Never").

In 2018, he released Lonesome as a Shadow, a collection of purely original songs.  It was recorded at Sam C. Phillips Recording Studio in Memphis, Tennessee, and produced by Matt Ross-Spang. The opening track, "I Wanna Cry", was written for his sister who had died from a methamphetamine overdose. The album was dedicated to Henry "Ragtime Texas" Thomas. Following its April release date, Crockett toured again backed by his band the Blue Drifters. His dates included venues such as the House of Blues in Houston, Washington, D.C.'s 9:30 Club, The Mint in Los Angeles and The Fillmore in San Francisco. In addition, he performed at festivals such as the Wheatland Music Festival, Portland, Oregon's Pickathon and Austin City Limits Music Festival.

In late 2018, Crockett issued Lil G.L.'s Blue Bonanza. Crockett noted that "Lil G.L. is my side name, like Hank [Williams] had Luke the Drifter. I use it for all my side projects and cover projects".  He explained the moniker was given to him by a local blues drummer, Jay Moeller, in reference to the obscure R&B singer G. L. Crockett. AllMusic stated "Lil G.L.'s Blue Bonanza is a companion of sorts to Charley Crockett's 2017 Lil G.L.'s Honky Tonk Jubilee". The album was primarily another compilation of cover versions, although Crockett's definition of the blues encompasses tracks including Jimmy Reed's "Bright Lights, Big City", Tom T. Hall's "That's How I Got to Memphis" and Danny O'Keefe's "Good Time Charlie's Got the Blues". In addition, Crockett covered work by Ernest Tubb, George Jones, and T-Bone Walker. Lil G.L.'s Blue Bonanza peaked at number 10 in the Billboard Blues Albums chart.

In early January 2019, Crockett underwent open-heart surgery. Pre-assessments for the surgery exposed that Crockett had a congenital heart condition where his heart had two out of three aortic valve flaps fused together, leading to Wolff–Parkinson–White syndrome.

Crockett released The Valley on September 20, 2019. The album features the single "Borrowed Time", which was co-written with Evan Felker of Turnpike Troubadours.

Field Recordings, Vol. 1 was released on April 3, 2020, and is a mixtape of 30 low-fidelity covers and originals recorded in Mendocino County, California. Crockett and Kyle Madrigal recorded the collection over the previous year using a 4-track recorder, an old CB radio microphone, and an old rotary telephone. Crockett said the songs came "from my street stuff and folk tunes, stuff I wrote that might not necessarily be best for these studio albums."

Crockett released his seventh album, Welcome to Hard Times, on July 31, 2020. It was produced by Mark Neill and includes songwriting contributions from The Black Keys' Dan Auerbach and singer/songwriter Pat McLaughlin. The album followed a life-threatening health scare in which he was diagnosed with a congenital heart condition that required heart surgery. It received glowing reviews, including from American Songwriter, who raved, "Crockett finds the sweet spot between country, soul, blues and folk on deceptively modest songs, effortless in their easy-going groove," while Texas Monthly stated, "Crockett makes a beeline for the album's central theme: wily survival in a socially, politically, and economically rigged system."

On February 26, 2021, Crockett released his next album, titled 10 For Slim: Charley Crockett Sings James Hand, a tribute album to James "Slim" Hand. It was met with critical acclaim from Rolling Stone, The Boot, Austin American-Statesman, Forbes, Saving Country Music, and American Songwriter among others.

Crockett released his ninth album, Music City USA, on September 17, 2021 via Son of Davy/Thirty Tigers. The lead single, "I Need Your Love", was featured on Rolling Stone as well as Brooklyn Vegan, who called it "a sweet and sultry slice of southern soul" and The Boot, who named it "a dose of horn-filled soul." Later that month, he earned the 2021 "Emerging Artist of the Year" award at the Americana Music Honors and Awards in Nashville, TN. Crockett closed out the year with his debut on Austin City Limits, which aired in October on PBS. He followed that up a couple months later with an appearance on CBS This Mornings "Saturday Sessions" performing "I Need Your Love," "Music City USA" and "I Feel For You" off his latest album.

In March 2022, he announced Jukebox Charley, a new album of cover songs and his third full-length in just over a year. The fourth installment of his Lil' G.L. covers series, the album was released on April 22 and featured classic country tunes from Tom T. Hall, Willie Nelson, George Jones, and more.

Charley Crockett performed on Jimmy Kimmel Live! on December 9, 2022.

Discography

Studio albums

Mixtapes

Extended plays

Singles

Music videos

Awards and nominations

References

External links
Official website

1984 births
Living people
People from San Benito, Texas
American blues singers
American country singer-songwriters
Singer-songwriters from Texas
American blues guitarists
American male guitarists
American country guitarists
Americana musicians
21st-century American guitarists
Guitarists from Texas
Country musicians from Texas
Davy Crockett
Cajun guitarists
American people of Creole descent
Jewish singers
Jewish American songwriters
Singer-songwriters from Louisiana